Michael O'Hara (born 29 September 1996 in Kingston) is a Jamaican sprinter who specializes in the 110 metres hurdles.

Career
He won a gold medal in the 200 m at the 2013 World Youth Championships.

His personal best time is 10.19 seconds, achieved in May 2014 in Kingston. He also has 20.45 seconds in the 200 metres, achieved in July 2014 in Eugene.

Personal best

Achievements

References

External links

 
 

1996 births
Living people
Sportspeople from Kingston, Jamaica
Jamaican male sprinters
20th-century Jamaican people
21st-century Jamaican people